The 2001 RTHK Top 10 Gold Songs Awards was held in 2001 for the 2000 music season.

Top 10 song awards
The top 10 songs (十大中文金曲) of 2001 are as follows.

Other awards
The top 10 outstanding artist was also extended to 15 artists.

References
 RTHK top 10 gold song awards 2001

RTHK Top 10 Gold Songs Awards
Rthk Top 10 Gold Songs Awards, 2001
Rthk Top 10 Gold Songs Awards, 2001